Sir John Gerald Patrick Sissons (28 June 1945 – 25 September 2016) was an English physician, specialising in nephrology and virology, focusing on cytomegalovirus. He was aFRCP, FRCPath, FMedSci and Regius Professor of Physic at the University of Cambridge.

Biography
Patrick Sissons was born in Hessle, East Riding of Yorkshire and attended Ilkley and Felsted School. He studied medicine at St Mary's Hospital Medical School, London. After graduation, he continued there, specialising in nephrology, studying immune-mediated kidney diseases. 
His clinical training was at the University of the West Indies.

Career
Sissons won an NIH Fogarty Fellowship and moved to the Scripps Research Institute in San Diego for 3 years.

He returned to London and continued at Hammersmith Hospital, working with Keith Peters (physician) on the virology research side and Jonathan Cohen, establishing a clinical infectious diseases service. He began working on cytomegalovirus during the late 1970s and 1980s with John Sinclair focusing on virus latency and reactivation in humans, which had been done in animal models only. Leszek Borysiewicz was his PhD student.

In 1987, he moved to the University of Cambridge, helped develop the Faculty of Clinical Medicine, connecting it with the MRC Laboratory of Molecular Biology and Addenbrooke's Hospital, helped to develop the Centre for Clinical Investigation, the Institute of Metabolic Science and the Cambridge Biomedical Research Centre and is said to have convinced AstraZeneca to move its research to Cambridge.

In 2005, Sissons became Regius Professor of Physic at the University of Cambridge after Peters retired, until his own retirement in 2012. He died in September 2016 from complications of Parkinson's disease.

References

1945 births
2016 deaths
Fellows of the Royal College of Physicians
Fellows of the Academy of Medical Sciences (United Kingdom)
Knights Bachelor
Fellows of Darwin College, Cambridge
Fellows of the Royal College of Pathologists
Regius Professors of Physic (Cambridge)